Fridtjof Mjøen (3 August 1897 – 21 October 1967) was a Norwegian actor and theatre director. He made his stage debut at Centralteatret in 1927. He was artistical director at Det Nye Teater from 1936 to 1937. During the 1940s and 1950s he played in various films, and in audio plays at Radioteatret.

Selected filmography
 Snowshoe Bandits (1928)
 The Stars Shine (1938)
  Twelve Minutes After Midnight (1939)
 One, But a Lion! (1940)
 Vigdis (1943)
 I moralens navn (1954)
 The Summer Wind Blows (1955)
 Kvinnens plass (1956)
 Hans Nielsen Hauge (1961)

References

1897 births
1967 deaths
Actors from Magdeburg
Norwegian theatre directors
Norwegian male stage actors
Norwegian male film actors
Norwegian male radio actors